Fardosa Ahmed (born ) is a Kenyan physician, entrepreneur, and health administrator, who serves as the chief executive officer of Premier Hospital, Mombasa, a private health facility that she co-founded and co-owns.

Background and education
Ahmed was born in Mombasa, the second-largest city in Kenya . She attended l, in Nairobi, Kenya's capital city. She then transferred to Loreto Convent Valley Road School, also in Nairobi, where she graduated with a High School Diploma. She was then admitted to the University of Nairobi, where she studied human medicine, graduating with a Bachelor of Medicine and Bachelor of Surgery degree. Later, she obtained a Postgraduate Diploma in Healthcare Management.

Career
After her one-year internship, she returned to her home-city of Mombasa, where she owned a piece of land in the suburb of Nyali. Using her own funds and money sourced from like-minded people, Dr Ahmed erected an eight-story commercial building on the land that she owned. Initially the intent was to build an office complex. Plans were changed later and Premier Hospital, Mombasa was created.

Premier Hospital is a private, for-profit, tertiary care health facility, with bed-capacity of 70, as of June 2019. Opened on 24 November 2017, the hospital employs over 200 staff and has a pediatric outpatient centre, a surgical suite, a cardiac suite, an orthopedics suite, a gynecology suite, an oncology suite, a dialysis centre, an outpatient chemotherapy suite and an endoscopy suite.

Other considerations

In September 2018, Business Daily Africa, a Kenyan, English language, daily newspaper, named Fadosa Ahmed, among the "Top 40 Under 40 Women in Kenya in 2018".

See also
 Gladys Ngetich
 [[Charity Wayua]
 Juliet Obanda Makanga

References

See also
Website of Premier Hospital
Why Kenya must invest in human capital

1980s births
Living people
21st-century Kenyan physicians
Swahili people
21st-century Kenyan women scientists
21st-century Kenyan scientists
Kenyan women physicians
Kenyan chief executives
People from Mombasa County
University of Nairobi alumni
21st-century women physicians